Gameboys is a 2020 Philippine boys' love web series directed by Ivan Andrew Payawal and written by Ash M. Malanum, with Perci Intalan and Jun Lana serving as executive producers under the creative production outfit, The IdeaFirst Company. Presented as a screenlife film, it stars Kokoy De Santos and Elijah Canlas as two boys—a live-stream gamer and his fan—who found each other online during the 2020 COVID-19 pandemic and the Luzon Island community quarantine.

Cast and characters

Main 
 Elijah Canlas as Cairo Lazaro, a live-stream gamer with username, Caimazing, being pursued by an unknown gamer and fan, Angel2000.
 Kokoy de Santos as Gavreel Mendoza Alarcon, an unknown gamer with username, Angel2000; Cairo's fan and secret admirer.

Recurring 
 Adrianna So as Pearl Gatdula, Gavreel's ex-girlfriend who became his best friend.
 Kyle Velino as Terrence Carreon, Gavreel's ex-boyfriend and Cairo's online game rival with username, GavreelsOnlyLove.
 Jerom Canlas as London Lazaro, Cairo's older brother.
 Miggy Jimenez as Wesley Torres, Cairo's childhood friend with username, masterwesley.
 Sue Prado as Leila Lazaro, Cairo's mother.
 Rommel Canlas as Arthur Lazaro, Cairo's deceased father.
 Angeli Nicole Sanoy as Risa Vargas, Cairo's friend.
 Kych Minemoto as Achilles De Dios, Terrence's former fling and now close friend.

Plot 
During the 2020 COVID-19 pandemic Luzon quarantine, live-stream gamer Cairo Lazaro (Caimazing) loses to Gavreel Alarcon (Angel2000) in an online game. When Cairo invites Gavreel for a rematch, Gavreel confesses his love for Cairo and asks for a date with Cairo in return. Although Gavreel wins the rematch and continues to express his love for Cairo, Cairo is hesitant to express his feelings. While both of them slowly bond with each other, Cairo also befriends Pearl, Gavreel's ex-girlfriend and now best friend. Meanwhile, Cairo is having family problems as his father was hospitalized because of coronavirus infection.

Terrence, the ex-boyfriend of Gavreel, tries to get back with Gavreel after he recently broke up with his girlfriend. In an attempt, Terrence creates a rift between Gavreel and Cairo by making Cairo believe that Gavreel used his grandmother, Lola Cora, who died the year prior, to be with Cairo. Later, Cairo realizes his mistake of believing Terrence, and apologizes to Gavreel. Terrence was later confronted by Gavreel, Cairo and Pearl in a group meeting where Gavreel reiterates to Terrence that he will not go back to a relationship with him, and that he is in love with Cairo.

Just when things are getting better between Cairo and Gavreel, Cairo learns from his older brother, London, that their father is not doing well. Cairo feels guilty about his father's situation. It turned out that Cairo ran away from their home, and his father was infected with the virus while looking for him. The story further reveals the reason why Cairo ran away: Risa, Cairo's former best friend who had a crush on him, outed him as gay to his family and friends on social media. Unable to face his family about his sexuality, Cairo ran away from home. Later, Cairo's mother, Leila, tearfully informed him that his father has died.

Gavreel and Pearl continue to support Cairo through his mourning on his father's demise. Both Terrence and Risa apologize for their mistakes and the troubles they caused in Cairo's and Gavreel's lives. Meanwhile, Leila decided to move the family to Bukidnon province, which Cairo hesitantly agrees. Cairo finally confesses his interest for Gavreel. Thereafter, Cairo and Gavreel meet in person for the first time with Pearl's help.

Episodes

Season 1

Season 2

Production

Development
On July 15, 2020, The IdeaFirst Company announced that Globe Telecom's cellular service brand, TM, will be presenting the series' episodes. On August 21, 2020, Bench, a Philippine clothing brand, was also welcomed on social media as the newest sponsor of the series.

A few hours before the premiere of Episode 9, "Say It With Love", series writer, Ash M. Malanum, tweeted that three more episodes will be added to the series bringing the total episodes to 13. However, the release of these episodes was delayed by two weeks after the Philippine government decided on August 2, 2020 to revert Metro Manila and nearby provinces to Modified Enhanced Community Quarantine (MECQ).

Filming
The first nine episodes of the series were shot completely online because of quarantine restrictions. Main actors Elijah, Kokoy, Adrianna and Kyle were asked to set up the frames and do their makeup themselves and Ivan directing the shots online. Family members of Kokoy De Santos and Elijah Canlas were also credited for helping with the production as the actors themselves act in their home. Elijah's brother Jerom and father Rommel also acted in the series as the brother and father character of Cairo, respectively.

Future
The IdeaFirst Company announced that they will be making a Gameboys spin-off series entitled “Pearl Next Door” on June 19, 2020. Adrianna So will reprise her role as the eponymous character, with Iana Bernardez, Philip Hernandez, Rachel Coates and Cedrick Juan joining the cast.

On September 13, 2020, after the premiere of the Season 1 Finale, the IdeaFirst Company announced that the series will have its second season. Prior to this announcement, the production company announced that it will make a movie adaptation of the series. On January 22, 2021, an official teaser for the second season was released on the IdeaFirst Company's YouTube Channel in collaboration with P-Pop boyband group's SB19 single 'Hanggang sa Huli'.

On June 13, 2021, Gameboys was premiered on GMA Network's digital channel Heart of Asia Channel, it was aired every Sundays at 11:00 pm to 12:00 am before sign off.

According to The IdeaFirst Company, the second season is going to be released on May 22, 2022. The company stated that the date will coincide the "World Gameboys Day."

Release

YouTube
The first episode, "Pass or Play", premiered on YouTube on May 22, 2020 at 8:00 PM (Philippine Standard Time). The series is considered the first Filipino BL drama to be produced by a professional media outlet.

On September 20, 2020, "Alt Gameboys" (Episode 13.5) was released dedicated to Terrence's journey into the dark side of the internet and online dating, notoriously referred to as Alter (short for Alternate) World. Directed by Perci Intalan, it also introduces a new character, Achilles De Dios.

Netflix
On November 23, 2020, Netflix Philippines' Twitter account announced that a Level-Up Edition will be released globally starting December 30, 2020. In keeping up with the “Level-Up Edition”, original scenes were refreshed and re-shot with additional footage, new correspondence and “Vidgram” stories from the characters never been seen before. In this version the first two episodes are re-edited into a single episode (titled "Pass or Play?") and consequently all subsequent episodes of the season are renumbered. "AltGameboys"—originally numbered 13.5—is presented as episode 13.

TV
The TV broadcast premiered on June 13, 2021 through Heart of Asia Channel in all Digital TV Boxes Nationwide.

Movie 
On July 31, 2021, Gameboys: The Movie was released.

Reception 
Leo Balante of Rank Magazine wrote, "In Gameboys, there are neither high-octane action, knee-slapping comedy, nor teleserye drama. Neither does it have fancy camera work, visual effects, nor A-listers as leads. All the viewers saw are two young men, in and out of video calls, portraying various levels of onscreen chase, before leading to a denouement that brought viewers to feel, think, and believe in a new order that is beautiful and possible."

The movie was featured on Teen Vogue's best BL dramas of 2021 list.

Music

Awards and nominations 
 Best Web Series (Indie Shorts Awards Seoul, 2020)
 Kids: Live Action (International Emmy Kids Awards Nominee, 2021)

Official Selection 
 Vancouver Independent Film Festival, 2020
 Los Angeles Asian Film Festival, 2020
 Indie Shorts Awards Buenos Aires, 2020
 Amsterdam World International Film Festival, 2020

See also 
 Oh, Mando!

References

External links
 

2020 web series debuts
2020 web series endings
Philippine LGBT-related web series
Television shows about the COVID-19 pandemic
Screenlife films